Gertrud Bäumer (12 September 1873, Hagen-Hohenlimburg, Westphalia – 25 March 1954, Bethel) was a German politician who actively participated in the German civil rights feminist movement. She was also a writer, and contributed to Friedrich Naumann's paper Die Hilfe. From 1898, Bäumer lived and worked together with the German feminist and politician Helene Lange.

Life
Gertrud Bäumer studied in Berlin and received her Ph.D. in 1905. Her dissertation was on Goethe's Satyron. Bäumer edited the Handbuch der Frauenbewegung [Handbook of the Women's Movement] from 1901–1906. From 1916–1920 she was in charge of the Social Pedagogical Institute with Marie Braun.

Bäumer was a member in close contact with the board of the national umbrella group of German women's organizations, the Bund Deutscher Frauenvereine (Federation of German Women's Associations) and during World War I she helped found the Nationaler Frauendienst [National Women's Service]. As such, Bäumer was aggressively opposed to the feminist-pacifist women supporting internationalism in Germany and elsewhere; stating: "We mustn't ever forget that it is not just military training that is being put to the test out there in the trenches and at sea, at the gun emplacements and in the air, but also German mothers' upbringing and German wives' care." After the war she joined the German Democratic Party, for which she was a Reichstag member between 1919 and 1932. Also during this time she was a delegate for youth politics at the League of Nations in Geneva.

Published works
Gertrud Bäumer's published works as cited by An Encyclopedia of Continental Women Writers.

Novels and short stories:
Sontag mit Silvia Monika [A Sunday with Silvia Monika], 1933.
Adelheid, Mutter der Königreiche [Adelheid, Mother of Kingdoms], 1936.
Der Park [The Park], 1937.
Der Berg des Königs [The King's Mountain], 1938.
Das königliche Haupt [The Royal Head], 1951.

Autobiography:
Lebensweg durch eine Zeitenwende [A Life's Path Crossing The Threshold to a New Age], 1933; reprinted under the titled Im Licht der Erinnerungen [In the Light of Memories] in 1953.

Essays, studies and letters:
Die Frau in der Kulturbewegung der Gegenwart [The Woman in the Cultural Movement of the Present Times], 1904.
Goethes Satyron [Goethe's Satyron], 1905.
Die Frauenbewegung und die Zukunft unserer Kultur [The Women's Movement and the Future of our Culture], 1909.
Die soziale Idee in den Weltanschauungen des 19. Jahrhunderts [The Social Idea in the Ideologies of the 19th Century], 1910.
Die Frau und das geistige Leben [Woman and the Intellectual Life], 1911.
Der Wandel des Frauenideals in der modernen Kultur [The Change of the Ideal of Women in Our Modern Culture], 1911.
Von der Kinderseele [On the Souls of Children], 1912.
Ida Freudenberg, 1912.
Was sind Wir unserem geistigen Ich schuldig? [What Do We Owe Our Intellectual Self?], 1912.
Entwicklung und Stand des Frauenstudiums und der höheren Frauenberufe [Development and Present Situation of Studies for Women and of Advanced Jobs for Women], 1912.
Die Frau in Volkswirtschaft und Staatsleben der Gegenwart [The Woman in Economy and Public Life in the Present Time], 1914.
Der Krieg und die Frau [War and Women], 1914.
Die Lehren des Weltkriegs für die deutsche Pädagogik [Consequences of WW 1 for German Pedagogy], 1915.
Weit hinter den Schützengräben [Far Behind the Trenches], 1916.
Zwischen Gräbern und Sternen [Between Tombs and Starts], 1919.
Helene Lange, 1918.
Studien über Frauen [Studies on Women], 1920.
Fichte und sein Werk [Fichte and His Work], 1921.
Das Reichsgesetz für Jugendwohlfahrt [The Imperial Law for Youth Welfare], 1923.
Die seelische Krise [The Crisis of the Soul], 1924.
Die Frau in der Krise der Kultur [The Woman in the Crisis of Our Culture], 1926.
Europäische Kulturpolitik [European Cultural Politics], 1926.
Deutsche Schulpolitik [German School Politics], 1928.
Grundlagen demokratischer Politik [Foundation of Democratic politics], 1928.
Grundsätzliches und Tatsächliches zur Bevölkerungsentwicklung [Fundamental Aspects and Facts of the Development of the Population], 1929.
Nationale und Internationale Erziehung in der Schule [National and International Education in School], 1929.
Die Frauengestalten der deutschen Frühe [Women Figures in the German Past], 1929.
Neuer Humanismus [New Humanism], 1930.
Schulaufbau, Berufsauslese, Berechtigungswesen [Reconstruction of the School, Selection of Jobs, Justification], 1930.
Heimatchronik während des Weltkriegs [Home Chronicle During the Time of WW1], 1930.
Sinn und Formen geistiger Fûhrung [Meaning and Forms of Intellectual Leadership], 1930.
die Frau im neuen Lebensraum [The Woman in New living Space], 1931.
Goethe-überzeitlich [Goethe-From a Transcendental Viewpoint], 1932.
Krisis des Frauenstudiums [Crisis of Women Studies], 1932.
Die Frau im deutschen Staat [The Woman in the German Nation], 1932.
Familienpolitik [Family Politics], 1933.
Der freiwillige Arbeitsdienst der Frau [The Voluntary Work Service of the Woman], 1933.
Männer und Frauen im geistigen Werden des deutschen Volkes [Men and Women in the Intellectual Development of the German People], 1934,
Ich kreise um Gott [I Am Circling Around God], 1935.
Wolfram von Eschenbach, 1938.
Krone und Kreuz [Crown and Cross], 1938.
Gestalt und Wandel [Form and Change], 1939.
Frauen der Tat [Women in Action], 1959.
Das Antlitz der Mutter [My Mother's Face], 1941.
Der ritterliche Mensch [The Chivalric Person], 1941.
Die Macht der Liebe [Love's Power], 1942.
Der neue Weg der deutschen Frau [The New Way for the German Woman], 1946.
Die Reichsidee bei den Ottonen [The Imperial Idea under the Ottonians], 1946.
Das hohe Mittelalter als christliche Schöpfung [The High Middle Ages as a Christian Creation], 1946.
Eine Woch im Mai [A Week in May], 1947.
Der Jüngling im Sternenmantel [The Youth in the Coat of Stars], 1947.
Der Dichter Fritz Usinger [The Poet Fritz Usinger], 1947.
Die christliche Barmherzigkeit als geschichtliche Macht [Christian Mercy as Historical Power], 1948.
Ricarda Huch, 1949.
Die drei göttlichen Komödien des Abendlandes [The Three European Divine Comedies, a study on Dante's Divina Commedia, Wolfram von Eschenbach's Parzival and Goethe's Faust], 1949.
Frau Rath Goethe, 1949.

Editions:
Der Traum vom Reich [The Dream about the Empire], 1955.
Goethe's Freundinnnen [Goethe's Girl Friends], 1909.
Die Religion und die Frau [Religion and the Woman], 1911.
Der deutsche Frauenkongreß Berlin [The German Women Congress in Berlin], 1912.
Die Deutsche Frau in der sozialen Kriegsfürsorge [The German Woman in the Veterans' Welfare System], 1916.
Eine Hand voll Jubel [A Handful of Jubilation], 1934.
Der Denker [The Thinker], 1950.

Periodicals edited:
Die Frau [The Woman], 1893-1944,
Hilfe [Help], 1915-1940.
Handbuch der Frauenbewegung [Handbook of the Women's Movement], 1901-1906.

References

Further reading

External links
 Biographie: Gertrud Bäumer, 1873-1954 at the Deutsches Historisches Museum
 Online Biography of Gertrud Bäumer (in German)
 
 Schaser, Angelika: Bäumer, Gertrud, in: 1914-1918-online. International Encyclopedia of the First World War.

1873 births
1954 deaths
People from Hagen
People from the Province of Westphalia
German Protestants
German Democratic Party politicians
German State Party politicians
Christian Social Union in Bavaria politicians
Members of the Weimar National Assembly
Members of the Reichstag of the Weimar Republic
German eugenicists
German feminists
20th-century German women writers
20th-century German women politicians
Harold B. Lee Library-related 20th century articles